V Bird (legally V Bird Airlines Netherlands BV) was a low-cost airline based in the Netherlands which operated services to northern and southern Europe. Its head office was on the grounds of Maastricht Aachen Airport in Beek, Netherlands.

History
The airline was established in 2003 and started operations on October 27, 2003. The airline suspended operations on October 8, 2004 and subsequently filed for bankruptcy on October 18, 2004. V Bird received an offer from an unnamed potential backer three days later with a view to restarting operations, but the airline was liquidated in early January 2005.

Fleet

The V Bird fleet consisted of the following aircraft:

See also
List of defunct airlines of the Netherlands

References

External links

V Bird (Archive)

Defunct airlines of the Netherlands
Defunct European low-cost airlines
Airlines established in 2003
Airlines disestablished in 2005
Dutch companies established in 2003
Dutch companies disestablished in 2005